Copelatus propinquus is a species of diving beetle. It is part of the genus Copelatus in the subfamily Copelatinae of the family Dytiscidae. It was described by Régimbart in 1895.

References

External links

propinquus
Beetles described in 1895